Hennes is a small village in Hadsel Municipality in Nordland county, Norway. The village is home to Innlandet Church, which serves the eastern part of the municipality.

References

Hadsel
Villages in Nordland